Cercomegistidae is a family of mites in the order Mesostigmata.

Species
Cercomegistidae contains four genera, with six recognized species:

 Genus Celaenogamasus Berlese, 1901
 Celaenogamasus hirtellus Berlese, 1901
 Genus Cercoleipus D.N.Kinn, 1970
 Cercoleipus coelonotus D.N.Kinn, 1970
 Genus Cercomegistus Berlese, 1914
 Cercomegistus abires Domrow, 1976
 Cercomegistus bruckianus Berlese, 1914
 Cercomegistus varaderoensis Wisniewski & Hirschmann, in Hirschmann & Wisniewski 1994
 Genus Vitzthumegistus Kethley, 1977
 Vitzthumegistus paguroxenus (André, 1937)

References

Mesostigmata
Acari families